Ian Michael Harding (born September 16, 1986) is an American actor. He is known for his role as Ezra Fitz in the Freeform mystery drama Pretty Little Liars from 2010 to 2017.

Early life
Harding was born in Heidelberg, West Germany, to an American military family.  His family moved to Virginia a few years later, where he joined the drama club at his high school, Georgetown Preparatory School in North Bethesda, Maryland. He later graduated with a Bachelor of Fine Arts from Carnegie Mellon University.

Career
Harding was cast as Ezra Fitz, the love interest of Aria Montgomery (Lucy Hale) on the Freeform mystery drama Pretty Little Liars, based on Sara Shepard's book series of the same name. The series ran from June 8, 2010 to June 27, 2017. Harding won seven Teen Choice Awards for his role.

Charity work
Harding has been working with the Lupus Foundation of America to raise funds and awareness for lupus research and education to support his mother, who has been living with lupus for more than 20 years.

Personal life
Harding married Sophie Hart in 2019. Their first child was born in September 2022.

Filmography

Film

Television

Web

Music videos

Awards and nominations

References

External links
 
 

21st-century American male actors
Male actors from Virginia
American male film actors
American male television actors
Carnegie Mellon University College of Fine Arts alumni
Living people
1986 births
Georgetown Preparatory School alumni